Jannat al-Baqīʿ ("The Baqi'") is the oldest and the first Islamic cemetery of Medina in the Hejazi region of present-day Saudi Arabia. It is located to the southeast of the Prophet's Mosque, which contains the graves of some of the Islamic prophet Muhammad's family and friends. It is also known as Baqīʿ al-Gharqad (meaning "Baqiʿ of the Boxthorn").

The grounds hold much significance for Muslims, being the resting place of many of Muhammad's relatives and companions, thus marking it as one of the two holiest cemeteries in Islamic tradition. Many narrations relate Muhammad issuing a prayer every time he passed it.

History

When Muhammad arrived at Medina from Mecca in September 622 CE, al-Baqi' was a land covered with Lycium shawii boxthorn trees. According to historical records, after the arrival of Muhammad, the houses of Medina developed near al-Baqi', which was therefore considered as the public tomb. The bramble-growth was cleared and the place consecrated to be the future cemetery of the Muslims who died at al-Madina. Also al-Baqi' was introduced as somewhere whose east side is Nakhl and west side contains houses. In fact, before demolition al-Baqi' was located behind the houses in the city.

During the construction of the Prophet's Mosque, on the site he purchased from two orphan children when he arrived after his migration from Mecca to Medina, As'ad ibn Zurarah, one of Muhammad's companions died. Muhammad chose the spot to be a cemetery and As'ad was the first individual to be buried in al-Baqi' among the Ansar.

While Muhammad was outside Medina for the Battle of Badr, his daughter Ruqayyah fell sick and died in 624. She was buried in al-Baqi'. She was the first person from Ahl al-Bayt (Household of Muhammad) buried in this cemetery.

Shortly after Muhammad arrived from Badr, Uthman bin Maz'oon died in 5/626-7 and was buried in al-Baqi'. He was considered the first companion of Muhammad from the Muhajirun to be buried in the cemetery. He was also called by Muhammad to be the first 'among us to go to the hereafter', and he also called the place where he is buried Rawhā.

When his youngest son Ibrahim died, he commanded that he be buried there also; he watered the grave and called this place Zawrā. As per his command two of his daughters Zainab and Umm Kulthum also buried near the grave of Uthman bin Maz'oon.

Initially, 3rd caliph Uthman was buried in the huge neighbouring Jewish graveyard. The first enlargement of al-Baqi' in history was made by Muawiyah I, the first Umayyad Caliph. In order to honour Uthman, Muawiyah included the huge Jewish graveyard into al-Baqi' cemetery. The Umayyad Caliphate built the first dome in al-Baqi' over his grave. During different times of history, many domes and structures were built or rebuilt over many famous graves in al-Baqi'.

Demolition

First demolition

The cemetery was demolished by forces loyal to the Wahhabi-Saudi alliance in 1806 and 1925 (or 1926).

At the beginning of the Wahhabis of Najd's nineteenth century (1806) control over Mecca and Medina, they demolished many of the religious buildings including tombs and mosques, whether inside or outside the Baqi, in accordance with their understanding of the Islamic doctrine forbidding idolatry. These were razed to the ground and demolished due to Wahhabi claims of grave worshipping.

Second demolition
The clan of Saud regained control of the Hijaz in 1924 or 1925. The following year King Ibn Saud granted permission to destroy the site with religious authorization provided by Qadi Abd Allah ibn Bulayhid, and the demolition began on 21 April 1926 (or 1925) by Ikhwan ("The Brothers"), a Wahabbi religious militia. The demolition included destroying "even the simplest of the gravestones". British convert Eldon Rutter compared the demolition to an earthquake: "All over the cemetery nothing was to be seen but little indefinite mounds of earth and stones, pieces of timber, iron bars, blocks of stone, and a broken rubble of cement and bricks, strewn about."

The second demolition was discussed in Majles-e Shora-ye Melli (The National Consultative Assembly of Iran) and a group of representatives was sent to Hijaz to investigate. In recent years, efforts were made by Iranian religious scholars and political figures to restore the cemetery and its shrines. Both Sunni and Shia protested against the destruction and rallies are held annually. The day is regarded as Yaum-e Gham ("Day of Sorrow"). Prominent Sunni theologians and intellectuals have condemned the "unfit" situation of the Baqi cemetery but the Saudi authorities have so far ignored all criticism and rejected any requests for restoration of the tombs and mausoleums.

Burials
For more: :Category:Burials at Jannat al-Baqī

Religious Islamic people buried at Al-Baqi'
 Halimah the milk-mother and nurse of Muhammad
 Wives of Muhammad, Sawdah bint Zam'ah, Aisha, Hafsa bint Umar, Zaynab bint Khuzayma, Umm Salama, Zaynab bint Jahsh, Umm Habiba, Juwayriya bint al-Harith, Safiyya bint Huyayy, Maria al-Qibtiyya except Khadijah bint Khuwaylid and Maymunah bint al-Harith who are buried in Jannatul Mualla in Mecca and at Sarif respectively.
 Ibrahim, Muhammad's son by Maria al-Qibtiyya, died in infancy
 Zainab,Ruqayyah and Umm Kulthum and  daughters of Muhammad and Khadijah
 Fatima, the daughter of Muhammad is purportedly buried there, though the location of her grave is disputed.
 Fatima bint Asad, aunt of Muhammad and mother of Caliph  Ali.
 ‘Abbas ibn ‘Abd al-Muttalib, uncle of Muhammad.
 Umm ul-Banin, who married Caliph Ali after the death of Fatimah and Safiyyah, Atika aunts of Muhammad.
 Hasan ibn Ali, grandson of Muhammad, son of Fatimah bint Muhammad and Imam Ali.
 Zayn al-Abidin, the grandson of Fatima bint Muhammad who is the only adult male that survived the Battle of Karbala because he was sick and could not fight.
 Muhammad al-Baqir, son of ‘Alī ibn Ḥusayn.
 Ja'far as-Sadiq, son of Muhammad al-Baqir.
 Abdullah son of Jaffar at-Tayyar, who was husband of Zainab, daughter of Ali and nephew of Ali 
(martyrs of Karbala).
 Aqeel ibn Abi Talib, the elder brother of Ali.
 Uthman ibn Affan, early companion, second cousin, twice son-in-law of Muhammad, brother-in-law of first Imam Ali and third Sunni Caliph. Uthman ibn Affan was at first buried in a Jewish graveyard behind Al-Baqi', but later Muawiyah I extended Al-Baqi' to include Uthman.
Abdullah ibn Uthman, grandson of Muhammad, son of Ruqayyah bint Muhammad and Uthman.
Abdulmejid II 1868-1944

Unknown burial locations
 Mohammad Hayya Al-Sindhi, Scholar
 Imam Shamil, Muslim leader and freedom fighter from the Caucasus
 Muhammad Sayyid Tantawy, Scholar
 Zine El Abidine Ben Ali, President of Tunisia
 Idris of Libya, King of Libya
 Hasan as-Senussi, Crown Prince of Libya
 Muhammad Zakariya Kandhalawi, Scholar and author of Fazael-e-A'maal
 Rafiuddin Deobandi, Vice-Chancellor of Darul Uloom Deoband

Gallery

See also
 Cemetery of Bab as-Saghir
 Holiest sites in Islam
 Jannatul Mualla

References

External links

 Visitation of Baqi
 The oldest photos of Jannat al-Baqi 
 Jannat al-Baqi website
 Map of Jannat al-Baqi
 History of the Cemetery of Jannat al-Baqi
 The Baqi Collection Photos
 Map of Jannat al-Baqi according to Sunni Muslim sources

Buildings and structures in Medina
Cemeteries in Saudi Arabia
History of Islam
Family of Muhammad
Islamic shrines in Saudi Arabia
Sunni cemeteries
Burial sites of the Senussi dynasty